Elexis Sinclaire is a fictional character in the SiN first-person shooter video game series by Ritual Entertainment. Elexis is the main antagonist character in the cyberpunk-themed SiN series, where she is a mysterious, wealthy and powerful mad scientist who is secretly engaged in organized crime and planning to make a radical artificial evolutionary advance to the human race, and enemy of the protagonist character, private security force commander John R. Blade. 

Elexis was introduced in the game SiN in 1998 and returned in 2006's game SiN Episodes in which her design was modeled on Bianca Beauchamp. She is also the main antagonist in Sin: The Movie, an anime film produced by ADV Films along with Ritual Entertainment and Phoenix Entertainment. Elexis is often perceived as one of the most sexual (either sexiest or most sexualized) female characters in video gaming. As such, she received a polarized critical reception.

Appearances

In video games
[[File:Elexis_Sinclaire_outro.png|thumb|left|Elexis Sinclaire as seen in the original SiN'''s final cutscene|alt=]]

At the beginning of SiN, the beautiful, promiscuous, charismatic, and ruthless Elexis Sinclaire is a genius-level biochemist and genetic engineer who is the CEO of a multi-billion-dollar, multinational pharmaceutical company called the SinTEK Industries. Elexis was born in 2006 and is 31-year-old by the events of the first game. Her biological mother Diane Kettle Sinclair abandoned her at an early age; during her upbringing she learnt from her devoted father, Dr. Thrall Sinclaire, and eventually took a position at SiNtek as a geneticist, bringing a breakthrough success to the company by discovering a way to stop the aging process through biotechnology. Rising through the corporate ranks, she eventually rose to supreme power after her father's mysterious disappearance. Elexis and SinTEK turned to illicit trades with their own brands of chemicals and drugs. Eventually her research led to the development of U4, SinTEK's most advanced chemical agent with mutagenetic properties. Ultimately, she secretly plans to overrun the world with her mutants and forcibly evolve humankind, bringing about a new world order under her domination.Amanda Du Preez, Gendered Bodies and New Technologies: Rethinking Embodiment in a Cyber-Era, Cambridge Scholars, 2009, p.119. In a speech for SinTEK in the game, she claims she wants to merely save humanity from itself.

In the games, Elexis is nemesis of the player character, the private security force HARDCORPS commander Colonel John R. Blade, and they are both based in Freeport City, a "near-future mixture of San Francisco, Tokyo and New York." After her narrow escape at the end of SiN, she is missing in the 1999's expansion pack SiN: Wages of Sin but returns four years later in SiN Episodes, in which "she's back and firmly entrenched at the top of society, worshiped by Freeport's wealthy elite. As the mutant problem continues to plague the poorer parts the city, Blade is now obsessed with bringing Sinclaire to justice. Elexis, meanwhile, has her own plans for Blade, and their history is connected far more than he realizes." She was supposed to reappear over the course of the next eight SiN Episodes, but only the first episode, Emergence, was released before series developer Ritual Entertainment ceased to exist in 2007. 

Elexis appears only in cutscenes using the game's engine during the first game's single-player mode, and eventually the pre-rendered ending video. Her in-game character models of her is also available to use as skins in the game's multiplayer mode, even as she has the same characteristics as Blade does and the players using it will always see Blade's hands holding the weapon. The first SiN also features an Easter egg scene of Elexis masturbating in a hot tub, which is only available after locating a key or using a cheat code. In SiN Episodes: Emergence, she only appears in person during the game's introduction cutscene that are run on the engine as she stands over the captured Blade while discussing her current plans with her henchman Viktor, and later as a hologram to give another speech.

Other appearances

Elexis' imagery was used for the Voodoo2 advertisement "Death never looked so pretty." Fetish model Vanessa Upton was hired by the publisher Activision to promote the first game in 1998, including in an exclusive Elexis cosplay photo session for the magazine MegaStar. Later, the character was portrayed by French-Canadian fetish and adult model Bianca Beauchamp to promote SiN Episodes: Emergence in a photo session. Beauchamp appeared in person at Electronic Entertainment Expo 2006.

Elexis also appears in the 2000 anime original video animation Sin: The Movie, a non-canonical retelling of the first game in which she is voiced by Kaori Yamagata. In the film, her father was taken down by the government for his mad biological experiments that she continues (later it is revealed that she actually keeps her father as a huge mutated monster). She also has a lover named Vincent, whom she also turns into a monster and then vivisects. At the end of the film, she falls from a skyrise building, presumably to her death.

Design and portrayal
Elexis is a seductive femme fatale type with raven-black hair and green eyes. As described as PC Zone, Elexis had "clearly experimented a little too much on herself and is a self-styled Mad Genius. She wears a series of futuristic leather outfits, has a twisted sense of humour and may be bisexual." She is also shown to be a bondage fetishist. In the original SiN game, many of the official arts showed her portrayed as armed, including in the game's package European cover pictures, but she wields no weapons at any point in the actual game's story mode. For the game's sequel, initially titled SIN2, at least one re-design of the character has been created and publicly revealed in 2003, but then abandoned. Elexis' ultimate new look in SiN Episodes was instead closely based on Bianca Beauchamp, who then served as Elexis' real-life model for publicity and trade show appearances.

According to Ritual Entertainment's CEO Harry Miller, "Despite her noble goal, her passion to reclaim her father's glory leads her to dispense with the normal scientific checks and balances, and she begins her slide into evil." As for the second game, Ritual's community relations manager Steve Hessel said "the resequencing process that put her DNA back together made her a bit younger, but mentally she's still her brilliant and scheming old self." Ritual's co-founder Richard Gray said Elexis and Blade "have kind of a strange obsession with one another for various reasons. It's almost like a love / hate relationship." 

Voice actress Hannah Logan, who portrayed the character in both games, thought she did it well as she could do "a really low" voice and "do sexy vixens pretty well and it comes pretty easily." Logan commented on Elexis and Blade: "Love and hate are different sides of the same coin; I think they are in 'love' with hating each other.  Passion, pain, pleasure, winning, it's all the same in their cat and mouse game. ... I think Elexis is very much in touch with her 'feminine' side, but uses it in a masculine way, as a weapon. A bimbo is, ultimately, a victim. Elexis knows exactly what she is doing - she uses her sensuality to win, not that it always works, but it is definitely a major piece of ammo in her arsenal." Beauchamp herself described the character simply as an "evil bitch".

Reception
Elexis Sinclaire was received mostly very positively, achieving high popularity herself, including having been voted the ninth best female character in the history of PC gaming by readers of GameSpot in 2000. According to Story-Driven Character Design, the "beautiful, sexy" Elexis Sinclair was in fact the main selling point of the first game. Power Play introduced SiN with "only two words: Elexis !" and titled their review "Elexis arrives", while PC Ultra included her among the three best elements of the game "definitely the most innovative opponent seen in the latest first-person shooters." GamesRadar later featured "Elexis’ sizzling flesh" in the article about video game franchises "founded on" breasts and Destructoid's Andy Dixon recalled how back in 1998, he bought SiN instead of Half-Life for only one reason: "That's how badly I wanted to see Elexis Sinclaire's polygon boobs."

Elexis Sinclaire has been often compared to Lara Croft from Tomb Raider, another popular sex symbol at the time. Upon the first game's release, Computer Games Magazines Jason Cross wrote Elexis has "a body that would make Lara Croft blush" while German magazine PC Action stated that Elexis and not Lara should be now a game symbol of "female power". A 1999 article about female video game characters in Polish magazine Gambler opined that Elexis was a "tremendous" challenger for Lara, as she was "even better built, with even greater bust and with a beauty mark like Cindy Crawford," and could be rivaled only by Zanthia from The Legend of Kyrandia: Hand of Fate and also comparing her with Liz Taylor as seen in the film Cleopatra. In 2008, MSN featured her among the five characters described as "some of the best-looking game characters with perfect figures", including Lara among others. Elexis was also compared to the other dominatrix-like video game characters Dark Queen (from Battletoads) and Ivy Valentine (from Soulcalibur), as well as to actress Charisma Carpenter, among others. Amanda du Preez of the University of South Africa analyzed Elexis in relation to the Greek mythology's Athena, Medea and Pandora.

As noted by Marc Saltzman's in Game Design, "it's hard not to argue that sex appeal had something to do with the success of Sins Elexis Sinclaire." Her physique granted her inclusions in numerous lists of the most sexy female characters in video games overall and villains in particular for many years to come. German magazine Power Play called her the most attractive "Bitch" (in English) of computer games in 1998 and readers of the Polish edition of GameStar voted her at 15th place in the poll for the title of "Miss of the Video Game World" in 2006. Listing her as one of "hottest" women games in video games in 2010, UGO stated: "Elexis Sinclaire is charming, brilliant, and an absolute fox with nigh-impossible proportions," additionally featuring the hot tub Easter egg among top sexy video game secrets. 

Including Elexis among his top ten personal favorites, Girls of gaming editor Mike Griffin commented: "Although the SiN game series has been retired, the busty CEO of SinTEK has a place in game villain history." In 2007, she was included in Tom's Hardware list of 50 greatest female characters in video game history, stating that "with the brains of a mad scientist and the body of an underwear model, Elexis is one of a kind." German magazine PC Games Hardware named her among the 112 most important female characters of PC games in 2008 twice (separately for her appearances in the original SiN and in Episodes), and Wirtualna Polska listed her as one of top ten female antagonists in gaming in 2011. During the early 2010s, GRY-Online included her among the ten most toxic women in video games while Virgin Media featured "the improbably proportioned Elexis" among top ten "game girls you wouldn't dare to date"; in iiNet's article on the "seven deadly sins of FPS gaming", Elexis represented lust. GameSpot compared her mansion in the first game to "an evil version of Batman's Wayne Manor" with "a great combination of aesthetics and deadliness." 

However, there was also some negative reception of the character, described by Matt Slagle of Associated Press as "outrageously proportioned". In a review of Emergence, Computer Gaming World criticized the "cringe-inducing scenes [of] villainous sexpot Elexis Sinclaire's digitized boobs practically slapping you in the face." Phaedra Boinodiris from WomenGamers.com, talking to GamesRadar in 2007, used Elexis as an example of game characters "sexualized to the point of deformity" as she looked "like she crawled out of an S&M club." In 2011, Wirtualna Polska ranked Elexis from the original SiN as the sixth "most unrealistic and sexist depiction of women in games". In 2012, Shelby Reiches of Cheat Code Central included "Elexis' Hidden Button" scene among the four worst cinematic scenes in games, commenting that "the player's final confrontation with villain Elexis Sinclaire, already dolled up to look like a stereotypical sex worker, involves her 'out-smarting' the player by evoking Basic Instinct''s Sharon Stone. Elexis, however, lacks her inspiration's sophistication," and calling it not as much as provocative but rather "awkward and nonsensical". UGO featured Elexis escaping by distracting the protagonist Blade "with the concept of her vagina" among the weirdest game endings.

References

External links 

Female characters in anime and manga
Female characters in video games
Female video game villains
Fictional biologists
Fictional bisexual females
Fictional businesspeople in video games
Fictional criminals in video games
Fictional geneticists
Fictional mass murderers
Fictional outlaws
First-person shooter characters
Genetically engineered characters in video games
LGBT characters in video games
Mad scientist characters in video games
Science fiction video game characters
Video game antagonists
Video game characters based on real people
Video game characters introduced in 1998